Michael Edward Moran (born 26 December 1935) was an English professional footballer who played as an inside forward.

Career statistics
Source:

References

1935 births
Sportspeople from Leek, Staffordshire
English footballers
Association football inside forwards
Port Vale F.C. players
Crewe Alexandra F.C. players
English Football League players
Living people